Oasis Academy Leesbrook  is coeducational secondary school  located in the Oldham in Greater Manchester, England. It is part of the Oasis Community Learning. It opened to pupils in September 2018. It moved to its new site on 9 November 2020. It has not had its first Ofsted inspection.

History
Oldham City Council and the Department for Education identified a need for 1000 extra secondary school places in East Oldham. Oasis Community Learning put forward a proposal to open a 1500 place Free School. This was approved in April 2017, and the site in Lees was agreed by Oldham Council in July 2017.The site was controversial as it formerly was the site of the failed Breeze Hill School that was demolished in 2013. The proposal was for a free-school, and Manchester was still reeling from the failure and closure of both the Greater Manchester UTC and the Collective Spirit Free School.

The school opened in a vacant GM-UTC building, in Oldham town centre in September 2018 and into their new purpose built building in November, 2020.

Description

Oasis Academy Leesbrook is part of the Oasis Community Learning group, and evangelical Christian charity. The trust have guided forty schools out of special measures. 19 per cent of the 52 Oasis academies classified as failing. Oasis has opened two other free schools Oasis Academy South Bank and Oasis Academy Silvertown and senior management and teachers have experience in other Oasis schools. The Oasis philosophy involves engaging the community from the start so they have ownership, and offering its facilities for the community to use. Almost 50% of the students are deprived receiving pupil premium and free school meals.
Parents sign a Home-school agreement where they accept a fairly strict discipline regime.

Oasis has a long-term strategy for enhancing the performance of its schools. Firstly it has devised a standard curriculum, that each school can safely adopt knowing it will deliver the National Curriculum. Secondly it has invested in staff training so they are focused on improving the outcomes for the students, and thirdly, through its Horizons scheme it is providing each member of staff and student with a tablet.

Building
The two and four storey blocks and hard landscaping were built by Galliford Try.

Academics
The academy currently serves students from Year 7–11.

Curriculum
Virtually all maintained schools and academies follow the National Curriculum, where success is judged on how well they succeed in delivering a 'broad and balanced curriculum'. Schools endeavour to get all students to achieve the English Baccalaureate qualification- this must include core subjects a modern or ancient foreign language, and either History or Geography.

The academy operates a three-year, Key Stage 3 where all the core National Curriculum subjects are taught. This is a transition period from primary to secondary education, that builds on the skills, knowledge and understanding gained at primary school, and introduces youngsters who are starting from a lower than average base to wider, robust and challenging programmes of study needed to gain qualifications at Key Stage 4. Students study Spanish, French or German.

References

Secondary schools in the Metropolitan Borough of Oldham
Free schools in England
Leesbrook
Schools in Oldham